Delta Ethniki was the fourth level of Greek football championship. During the period of its existence, it was the lowest national division of the Greek championship. It was founded in the 1982–83 season and abolished in the 2012–13 season, as it was merged with the third division (Football League 2). Its history therefore spans 31 years.

Many historical clubs of first division (Super League) have played in Delta Ethniki, such as Iraklis (2011–12 season), Ethnikos Piraeus, Apollon Smyrnis and Atromitos. The clubs of Delta Ethniki were divided in groups on the basis of geographical criteria. The groups usually comprised 10 teams, though this number varied between 4 and 12 over the years.

Champions
Below follows the list of the champions by year.

Performance by club (1982–2013)

Seasons in Delta Ethniki
Too many clubs have played in the championship of Delta Ethniki during the years that existed. Below follows a list with the clubs with the most number of seasons in Delta Ethniki.

Notes
 That year the champions clubs played play-off games so as to promote to the third division. The scores were: Ilisiakos - Chalkida 2–1, Doxa Drama - Averof Ioannina 5–2, Pierikos - Rodos 0–2, Pontiakos Nea Santa - Thyella Patra 2–4, Veria - Atsalenios 2–1

See also
Football records and statistics in Greece

References

External links 
Site of the Delta Ethniki
League at soccerway.com

 
Football leagues in Greece
Greece
Defunct football competitions in Greece